In mathematics, the Angelescu polynomials πn(x) are a series of polynomials generalizing the Laguerre polynomials introduced by . The polynomials can be given by the generating function

They can also be defined by the equation 
where  is an Appell set of polynomials (see ).

Properties

Addition and recurrence relations 
The Angelescu polynomials satisfy the following addition theorem:

where  is a generalized Laguerre polynomial.

A particularly notable special case of this is when , in which case the formula simplifies to

The polynomials also satisfy the recurrence relation

 
This can be generalized to the following:

 
a special case of which is the formula .

Integrals 
The Angelescu polynomials satisfy the following integral formulae:

(Here,  is a Laguerre polynomial.)

Further generalization 

This q-analog can also be given as a generating function as well:

References

Polynomials